The Baku Stock Exchange (BSE) is the main stock exchange in Azerbaijan. BSE is organized in the form of a closed joint stock company with 19 shareholders.

Activity 
Baku Stock Exchange trades short-term treasury bonds, common stocks (primarily from former state-owned enterprises that have been privatized, including food and beverage, construction, and banking companies), and foreign currency futures.

BSE carries out trading corporate securities. Trading, on primary and secondary markets of government securities (T-bills of the Ministry of Finance of Azerbaijan and banknotes of the Central Bank of Azerbaijan) are carried out solely at BSE. The state regulatory authority for the stock exchange and the Azerbaijani securities market is the Financial Markets Supervisor Authority. 

BSE's activity is regulated by the following legislative acts and documents:
 The Civil Code of Azerbaijan
 The normative-legal acts of the State Committee for Securities of Azerbaijan
 The internal rules of BSE

History 
Initiative group for establishment of the Stock Exchange was organized on 25 December 1999. Baku Stock Exchange began its operations on February 15. The first trading operation at the stock exchange was carried out on September 1, 2000. 

Corporate bonds started to be traded on BSE in January 2004. The first equity trade on Baku Stock Exchange was carried out in April 2004. Central Bank began to trade its Notes on Baku Stock Exchange on September 14, 2004. Azerbaijan Mortgage Fund started to trade its bonds on BSE in June 2009. Market maker institution of BSE was established in January 2013. Derivative financial instruments started to be traded on BSE in March 2014. BSE introduced Centralized Trade Platform – CETA in February 2016. SOCAR bonds began to be traded on BSE in October 2016.

Management 
The current head of the board of directors of BSE is Eldar Abdullayev. The supervisory board is headed by Yashar Mammadov.

Organizational structure

Bell events 
Opening and closing bells on the BSE symbolize the beginning and end of each trading day of securities. As trading transactions are carried out electronically, bell ringing ceremonies are only used to keep the tradition. These ceremonies are conducted to highlight important events regarding the stock market, as well as to bring attention to social affairs. The first bell event was organized on February 17, 2006 on BSE to introduce CETA (Centralised Exchange Trading in Azerbaijan) in the framework of the project “Modernization of Capital Markets”.

Another event was conducted on March 9, 2017 with the attendance of BSE in “Ring the Bell for Gender Equality” initiative to raise the awareness of gender equality organized by UN Women, IFC, Sustainable Stock Exchanges Initiative, Women in ETFs and World Federation of Exchanges.

Trading hours 
The exchange's normal trading sessions are from 10:00 a.m. till 1:00 p.m. and from 2:15 p.m. till 4:00 p.m. (local time, UTC+4) from Monday till Friday. The exchange is closed for the following days: Saturday, Sunday and official non-working day declared by the Government for public holidays.

See also
 Financial Markets Supervisor Authority
 List of stock exchanges
 List of European stock exchanges

References

External links
 Official site 
 Baku Stock Exchange - General Inf
 Financial Markets Supervisor Authority

Stock exchanges in Europe
Stock exchanges in Asia
Capital markets of Azerbaijan
Financial regulatory authorities of Azerbaijan
Economy of Azerbaijan
Economy of Baku
Financial services companies established in 2000
2000 establishments in Azerbaijan